Seo Seung-hyun (born 24 March 1991) is a Korean handball player for Hanam Handball Club and the Korean national team.

He represented Korea at the 2019 World Men's Handball Championship.

References

1991 births
Living people
Korean male handball players